Jean-Paul Laufenburger (19 November 1943 – 16 November 2014) was a French footballer who played as a goalkeeper.

Career
Born in Mulhouse, Laufenburger started his football with the youth teams of the local football club Mulhouse, but he started his active career with Sochaux-Montbéliard in 1962. After just two years he signed for Basel and stayed there for ten seasons.

Laufenburger won the Swiss championship title five times. For the first time in Basel's 1966–67 season. In that season Laufenburger also won the double with Basel. In the Cup final in the former Wankdorf Stadium on 15 May 1967 Basel's opponents were Lausanne-Sports. Helmut Hauser scored the decisive goal via penalty. The game went down in football history due to the sit-down strike that followed that penalty goal. With the score at 1–1 after 88 minutes play, referee Karl Göppel awarded Basel a controversial penalty. After the 2–1 lead for Basel the Lausanne players subsequently refused to resume the game and they sat down demonstratively on the pitch. The referee was forced to abandon the match. Basel were awarded the cup with a 3–0 forfeit.

As well as the championship, Laufenburger won the Swiss Cup and the Swiss League Cup. He played a total of 107 matches for Basel, including 71 in the Championship, Cup and League Cup. The other 36 were in European Cup, UEFA Cup and Fairs Cup.

After his ten years with FC Basel, Laufenburger returned to and played a further two years for his youth club Mulhouse in the French Division 2.

Personal life
Laufenburger's nick name was "Bolle", not only to his family and friends, but he also called so by the Basel fan culture. He lived in Village-Neuf on the French side of the border by Basel. He was married to Agnès. He suffered from Parkinson's disease and was forced into early retirement. He died in 2014.

Honours
Basel
 Swiss League: 1966–67, 1968–69, 1969–70, 1971–72, 1972–73
 Swiss Cup: 1966–67; runner-up: 1969–70, 1971–72, 1972–73
 Swiss League Cup: 1972
 Coppa delle Alpi: 1969, 1970
 Uhren Cup: 1969, 1970

Sources and references
 Rotblau: Jahrbuch Saison 2015/2016. Publisher: FC Basel Marketing AG. 
 A list of Swiss Cup Finals at RSSSF

1943 births
2014 deaths
French footballers
Association football goalkeepers
Ligue 2 players
Swiss Super League players
FC Mulhouse players
FC Sochaux-Montbéliard players
FC Basel players
French expatriate footballers
French expatriate sportspeople in Switzerland
Expatriate footballers in Switzerland